Piers Raymond Courage (27 May 1942 – 21 June 1970) was a British racing driver. He participated in 29 World Championship Formula One Grands Prix, debuting on 2 January 1967. He achieved two podium finishes, and scored 20 championship points.

Biography
Piers Courage was the eldest son and heir to the Courage brewing dynasty. Educated at Eton College, he began his racing career in his own Lotus 7.

Following a brief stint touring the European F3 racing circuit in 1964 with a Lotus 22, along with Jonathan Williams, good results persuaded him to pursue a full season in 1965. It was in this season, driving a 1.0L F3 Brabham for Charles Lucas, that he first formed an alliance with Frank Williams, at that time Lucas's other driver and sometime mechanic. A string of good results, including four high-profile wins, encouraged Colin Chapman to offer Courage a seat in a Lotus 41 for the 1966 F3 season. This car was inferior to the dominant Brabhams but Courage still managed to outperform them on occasion, earning him a step up to the F2 category for the 1966 German Grand Prix, where he crashed out.

Signed by the BRM works Formula 1 team for 1967, alongside Chris Irwin, his wild driving style caused him to repeatedly crash out of races and his tendency to spin at crucial moments led to the team dropping him after the 1967 Monaco Grand Prix. He completed the remainder of the season concentrating on his alternative drive, as was common in the 1960s, in John Coombs's F2 McLaren M4A, finishing fourth in the unclassified drivers' championship. At the end of the season he purchased the car from Coombs. A good run in the McLaren during the winter Tasman Series, including a win at the last race, resulted in Tim Parnell offering a drive in his works-supported Reg Parnell Racing BRM team for 1968. In addition to a good run in F1 in 1968 – including points-scoring finishes in France and Italy – Courage also drove for old friend Frank Williams's F2 team. When Frank Williams Racing Cars decided to make the step up to F1 in 1969, Courage was their first choice as driver.

In Courage's hands, Williams's dark-blue liveried Brabham BT26 was more than a match for many of the works teams. He finished second in both the Monaco Grand Prix and the US Grand Prix, at Watkins Glen. Perhaps his finest drive of the season, though, was during the 1969 Italian Grand Prix at the high-speed Monza circuit. Despite an older car, and a power deficit, he managed to stay with the leading pack for the majority of the race. Only fuel starvation caused his pace to slow near the end, and he finally finished in fifth. A second fifth place, in the British Grand Prix, saw Courage finish the season on sixteen points in eighth place in the drivers' championship.

Accident and death

Following a business arrangement with Alejandro de Tomaso, Williams switched to a newly designed De Tomaso chassis for the 1970 Formula One season. Unfortunately for Courage, the De Tomaso proved to be overweight and unreliable, and only a third place in the non-championship International Trophy alleviated a poor string of results in the early season. The Dutch Grand Prix seemed to be going slightly better, with Courage qualifying in ninth place around the Zandvoort Circuit. Running in the middle of the field, the De Tomaso's front suspension or steering broke on the bump at Tunnel Oost, causing the car to suddenly go straight on instead of finishing the high-speed bend. It then rode up an embankment (one of the Zandvoort dunes) and disintegrated, with the engine breaking loose from the monocoque, upon which it burst into flames. To lighten the De Tomaso, magnesium was used in its chassis and suspension. The magnesium burned so intensely that many nearby trees and bushes were set alight.

During the impact, one of the front wheels broke off the car and hit Courage's head, tearing away his helmet (both the wheel and the helmet came rolling out of the cloud of dust at the same time). It is assumed that this impact broke Courage's neck or caused fatal head injuries and that he died instantly as a result. Courage was survived by his wife, Lady Sarah Marguerite Curzon (b. 1945), and his two sons, Jason Piers Courage (b. 10 February 1967) and Amos Edward Sebastian Courage (b. 26 February 1969).

Courage was buried in St Mary the Virgin churchyard, Shenfield, Essex.

Just three years later, Roger Williamson crashed fatally when his car came to rest upside down and burst into flames at the same spot, the Tunnel Oost bump, where Courage's accident had started.

Racing record

Complete Formula One World Championship results
(key)

Complete Formula One non-championship results
(key)

Complete 24 Hours of Le Mans results

Complete Tasman Series results
(key)

Complete European Formula Two Championship results
(key)

 Graded drivers not eligible for European Formula Two Championship points

Further reading
 Cooper, A. 2003. Piers Courage: Last of the Gentleman Racers. Haynes Group. 224pp.

References

External links

 Career synopsis at gpracing.net
 Career synopsis at sportnetwork.net

1942 births
1970 deaths
English racing drivers
English Formula One drivers
European Formula Two Championship drivers
Racing drivers who died while racing
Sport deaths in the Netherlands
24 Hours of Le Mans drivers
Tasman Series drivers
Team Lotus Formula One drivers
Reg Parnell Racing Formula One drivers
Williams Formula One drivers
English people of French descent
People educated at Eton College
World Sportscar Championship drivers